Ealing North is a constituency, created in 1950.  Since the 2019 general election, it has been represented in the House of Commons of the UK Parliament by James Murray of Labour Co-op.

History
Straddling the Western Avenue and directly south of Harrow, Ealing North occupies the north-western part of the London Borough of Ealing.

From the February 1974 to 2005 general elections inclusive, it was a Labour-Conservative marginal, being won by the party forming the government, and thus a bellwether. Since 1997, is on the length of tenure measure (but not necessarily extent of majority) a "safe" Labour seat. The party's newly selected candidate for MP in 2019 came 12,269 votes ahead of the Conservative candidate, a majority of almost 25% of the votes cast.

Boundaries

1950–1974: The Municipal Borough of Ealing wards of Greenford Central, Greenford North, Greenford South, Hanger Hill, Northolt, and Perivale.

1974–1983: The London Borough of Ealing wards of Brent, Cleveland, Horsenden, Mandeville, Perivale, Ravenor, and West End.

1983–1997: The London Borough of Ealing wards of Argyle, Costons, Hobbayne, Mandeville, Perivale, Ravenor, West End, and Wood End.

1997–2010: The London Borough of Ealing wards of Argyle, Costons, Hanger Hill, Hobbayne, Horsenden, Mandeville, Perivale, Pitshanger, Ravenor, West End, and Wood End.

2010–present: The London Borough of Ealing wards of Cleveland, Greenford Broadway, Greenford Green, Hobbayne, North Greenford, Northolt Mandeville, Northolt West End, and Perivale.

Boundaries redrawn in 2010
Per its review of parliamentary representation in North London under the national Fifth review, the Boundary Commission for England saw made minor changes to Ealing North. Part of Greenford Broadway ward, along with tiny parts of Hobbayne; and Dormers Wells wards were transferred to Ealing Southall. Tiny parts of the latter two wards were exchanged in return. Parts of Ealing Broadway and Hanger Hill wards were moved to the new Ealing Central and Acton so the latter came into existence to avoid its forerunner's mention of Shepherd Bush and avoid its containing much of that part of the London Borough of Hammersmith and Fulham.

Members of Parliament

Election results

Elections in the 2010s

Elections in the 2000s

Elections in the 1990s

Elections in the 1980s

Note: This constituency underwent boundary changes after the 1979 election, so was notionally a Labour seat.

Elections in the 1970s

New constituency boundaries introduced for the February 1974 general election.

Elections in the 1960s

Elections in the 1950s

See also
 List of parliamentary constituencies in London

Notes

References

External links 
Politics Resources (Election results from 1922 onwards)
Electoral Calculus (Election results from 1955 onwards)

Parliamentary constituencies in London
Constituencies of the Parliament of the United Kingdom established in 1950
Politics of the London Borough of Ealing